Berbourg is a small town in the commune of Manternach, in eastern Luxembourg.  , the town has a population of 627.

The journey time between Luxembourg and Berbourg is around 1h 11m and covers a distance of around 32 km.

References

Manternach
Towns in Luxembourg